Chalgrave Castle stood to the south of the large village of Toddington, Bedfordshire.

This was a timber motte and bailey castle, constructed in two phases, built during the 11th century (around 1086). By the 13th century, it had been abandoned.

The site was excavated in 1970, but has since been completely leveled. Nothing visible remains.

See also
Castles in Great Britain and Ireland
List of castles in England

References
Fry, Plantagenet Somerset, The David & Charles Book of Castles, David & Charles, 1980.

External links
 English Heritage Monument No. 359611
 Investigation History

Castles in Bedfordshire